A Cathead is a beam on a ship for raising the anchor. Cathead or Cat head also may refer to:

 a windlass or capstan used in machinery such as a hoisting drawworks
 A type of biscuit in the cuisine of the Southern United States
 The Cat Heads, San Francisco indie rock band
 Tim Phillips (musician), of the band Cathead
 Cat heads, an inexpensive copy of the Converse Chuck Taylor All-Stars
 Cat-Head Comics, a defunct comic book publisher
 The head of a cat